HR 6902 (also designated V2291 Oph) is a binary system located 790 light years away from the Sun in the Ophiuchus constellation. The system includes an orange bright giant star and a B-type main sequence star, forming an eclipsing binary of Zeta Aurigae type. The system is also surrounded by a warm circumstellar envelope and the spectra show silicon and carbon absorption up to a distance of 3.3 giant radii.

References

Ophiuchus (constellation)
G-type bright giants
Eclipsing binaries
B-type main-sequence stars
6902
Ophiuchi, V2291
169690
090313
Durchmusterung objects